State Road 176 (NM 176) is a  state highway in the US state of New Mexico. NM 176's western terminus is at U.S. Route 62 (US 62), US 180 and NM 243 northeast of Carlsbad, and the eastern terminus is a continuation as Texas State Highway 176 (SH 176) at the Texas/ New Mexico border.

Major intersections

See also

References

External links

176
Transportation in Lea County, New Mexico